Eucalyptus haemastoma, commonly known as scribbly gum, is a species of tree that is endemic to the Sydney region. It has white or silvery grey bark, lance-shaped or curved adult leaves, flower buds in groups of between nine and fifteen, white flowers and conical or hemispherical fruit. It is one of three eucalypts with prominent insect scribbles in the bark.

Description
It has smooth white, silvery grey or yellow bark with insect scribbles. Flowering occurs between July and November and the flowers are white.

This species intergrades with E. racemosa, also a scribbly gum, mainly in the south of the Sydney area. A third scribbly gum, E. rossii is found further inland, on the slopes and tablelands between Tenterfield and Bombala.

Taxonomy and naming
Eucalyptus haemastoma was first formally described in 1797 by James Edward Smith in Transactions of the Linnean Society of London. Smith noted "[f]ruit globose, cut off at the summit, its orifice surrounded by a broad deep-red border". The specific epithet is derived from the Greek haima, 'blood' and stoma, 'mouth', referring to the reddish disc of the fruit.

Distribution and habitat
This scribbly gum grows in woodland on shallow sandy soil derived from sandstone. It occurs in the Sydney region between Lake Macquarie and the Royal National Park.

See also

List of Eucalyptus species

References

Flora of New South Wales
haemastoma
Myrtales of Australia
Trees of Australia
Plants described in 1797
Taxa named by James Edward Smith